Gaillea canetae is a species of sea snail, a marine gastropod mollusk in the family Eosiphonidae, the true whelks and their allies.

Description

Distribution
A rare deepwater species. 
Taken alive in fish traps set at 1,700 ft. depth (515 metres) 
Offshore West coast BARBADOS, Lesser Antilles.

References

 Fraussen, K.; Stahlschmidt, P. (2016). The extensive Indo-Pacific deep-water radiation of Manaria E.A. Smith, 1906 (Gastropoda: Buccinidae) and related genera, with descriptions of 21 new species. in: Héros, V. et al. (Ed.) Tropical Deep-Sea Benthos 29. Mémoires du Muséum national d'Histoire naturelle (1993). 208: 363-456

External links
 Kantor Yu.I., Puillandre N., Fraussen K., Fedosov A.E. & Bouchet P. (2013) Deep-water Buccinidae (Gastropoda: Neogastropoda) from sunken wood, vents and seeps: Molecular phylogeny and taxonomy. Journal of the Marine Biological Association of the United Kingdom, 93(8): 2177-2195

CategoryEosiphonidae
Fauna of the Lesser Antilles
Marine fauna of North America
Marine fauna of South America
Gastropods described in 1944